Uluella is a monotypic genus of Panamanian jumping spiders containing the single species, Uluella formosa. It was first described by Arthur Merton Chickering in 1946, and is found in Panama.

References

External links
 Diagnostic drawings of U. formosa

Further reading

Endemic fauna of Panama
Monotypic Salticidae genera
Salticidae
Spiders of Central America